Igor Marenić (born 2 January 1986) is a Croatian professional sailor. Competing in the 470 class with Šime Fantela, he won gold at the 2016 Summer Olympics, the 2009 World Championships, and three European Championships (2009, 2011, 2012).

Life and career 
A resident of Zadar, where he moved in 2001, Marenić was born in Mali Lošinj, Croatia, and is originally from Cres. He started sailing in his native Cres with JK Reful in 1995, in the Optimist class. He trained in his native city, and on the day he turned 24, Marenić was awarded by the city of Cres one of its greatest recognitions, Pro Insula, for achievements and contribution of importance for the development of the City of Cres, and especially for the exceptional sports results achieved in sailing. From 1998 to 2001 he was a member of the Croatian national team, and in 2000 he was fifth at the World Championships. In 1999 he competed in the Optimist World Championships in Martinique.

At the 470 World Championships in 2009 in Rungsted, Fantela and Marenić became the first Croatians to win a gold medal at the ISAF World Championships. In 2011 in Helsinki, the two won gold in the 470 class at the European Championships.

Marenić competed at the 2008 and 2012 Summer Olympics in the men's 470 class event, both times competing with Fantela.

Orders
 Order of Danica Hrvatska with face of Franjo Bučar - 2016

References

External links
 
 
 

1986 births
Living people
Croatian male sailors (sport)
Olympic sailors of Croatia
Olympic gold medalists for Croatia
Olympic medalists in sailing
Sailors at the 2008 Summer Olympics – 470
Sailors at the 2012 Summer Olympics – 470
Sailors at the 2016 Summer Olympics – 470
Medalists at the 2016 Summer Olympics
Mediterranean Games gold medalists for Croatia
Mediterranean Games silver medalists for Croatia
Mediterranean Games medalists in sailing
Competitors at the 2009 Mediterranean Games
Competitors at the 2013 Mediterranean Games
Universiade medalists in sailing
Universiade gold medalists for Croatia
Medalists at the 2005 Summer Universiade
470 class world champions
World champions in sailing for Croatia
People from Mali Lošinj